2000 Years: The Millennium Concert is a two-disc set and the third live album by Billy Joel, released in 2000. On May 31, 2000, it was certified Gold by the RIAA for sales of 250,000 copies.

The album was recorded on New Year's Eve 1999 at Madison Square Garden in New York City, during Joel's The Night of Two Thousand Years Tour. Some alterations were made before its release: some songs are not the same version featured in the original concert (like "Big Shot"), others were edited in studio.

2000 Years: The Millennium Concert also marked the first time several songs had to be transposed to lower keys to accommodate Joel's deepening voice. "Only the Good Die Young" (C to B), "Goodnight Saigon" (C to B), "I Go To Extremes" (C to B), and "The River of Dreams" (G to F#) are a semitone lower. "New York State of Mind" (C to Bb), "I've Loved These Days" (C to Bb), and "This Night" (A to G) are a tone lower. "2000 Years" is a tone and a half lower (F to D).

Track listing
All songs written by Billy Joel, except where noted.

Disc one

Disc two

Some editions include a bonus track:

"This Is the Time" (live) European release: Columbia 497981 2

"This Is the Time" (live) and "Just The Way You Are" Japanese release: Sony SRCS 2267-8, which also included a 48-page booklet.

Several songs were performed in the concert but not included on the CD: 
 "Pressure" and "Just the Way You Are" were performed in between "Don't Ask Me Why" and "New York State of Mind."
 "This is the Time" was performed in between "My Life" and "Allentown."
 "Uptown Girl" was performed in between "Prelude/Angry Young Man" and "Only the Good Die Young" (transposed from the key of E to D). 
 "Miami 2017 (I've Seen the Lights Go Out on Broadway)" and "And So it Goes" were performed in between "Big Man and Mulberry Street" and "2000 Years."
 A cover of The Jimi Hendrix Experience's "Purple Haze" was performed in between "The River of Dreams" and "Scenes from an Italian Restaurant."
 Covers of Led Zeppelin's "Good Times Bad Times" and Mark James' "Suspicious Minds" were performed in between covers of Sly and the Family Stone's "Dance to the Music" and The Rolling Stones' "Honky Tonk Women."
 After "This Night," "Souvenir" and "Piano Man" were performed to conclude the concert. "Souvenir" was transposed from the key of E flat to D and "Piano Man" from C to B.

Personnel 
 Billy Joel – lead vocals, keyboards 
 David Rosenthal – keyboards, backing vocals 
 Mark Rivera – keyboards, guitars, saxophones, flute, backing vocals 
 Tommy Byrnes – guitars, backing vocals 
 Crystal Taliefero – guitars, percussion, saxophone, backing vocals 
 David Santos – bass 
 Liberty DeVitto – drums 
 Richie Cannata – alto saxophone, soprano saxophone, tenor saxophone 
 Ozzie Melendez – trombone 
 Barry Danielian – trumpet
 The Philadelphia Orchestra – orchestra (1)
 Eugene Ormandy – conductor (1)
 Mormon Tabernacle Choir – choir (1)
 Melodie Crittenden – backing vocals
 Kim Keyes – backing vocals 
 Curtis King – backing vocals 
 Michael Mellett – backing vocals 
 Marlon Saunders – backing vocals 
 Arif St. Michael – backing vocals 
 Biti Strauchn – backing vocals

Charts

Weekly charts

Certifications

References

Billy Joel live albums
2000 live albums
Albums recorded at Madison Square Garden
Sony Music live albums